Baldeo Singh was  ruling Maharaja of the princely state of Bharatpur (1823–1825) and the successor of Randhir Singh after his death in 1823. Randhir Singh had no son and, as per rule, his brother Baldeo Singh ascended the throne after his death in 1823. He was succeeded by his five-year-old son Balwant Singh.

References 

Rulers of Bharatpur state
1825 deaths
Year of birth unknown
Jat rulers
Jat